LOL (stylised ) is the debut studio album by Polish pop group Blog 27, released in Poland in 2005 and internationally in 2006.

Release
The album was originally released in Poland on Ala and Tola's 13th birthday on 27 November 2005. The first edition included only 10 tracks and 2 music videos. The second edition, released in spring 2006, included two new songs plus instrumental karaoke version of all 12 tracks. This edition also had the outro in "I'm Callin' U" edited out and sported a slightly different cover. The Japanese version released later that year used an entirely different cover picture. On 27 November 2006, the album was re-released again, replacing the original version of "Who I Am?" with Tola's solo re-recording and adding a guitar version of the song. It came with a DVD containing music videos, making-of material, concert footage, an interview, and more.

Track listing

First edition (2005)
"Hey Boy (Get Your Ass Up)" – 3:23
"Uh La La La" – 3:13
"I Want What I Want" – 3:04
"Turn You On to Music" – 2:45
"Stay Outta My Way" – 3:20
"Destiny" – 2:58
"Wid Out Ya" – 3:03
"Life Like This" – 2:45
"I'm Callin' U" – 3:30
"Who I Am?" – 3:09
Music videos:
"Hey Boy (Get Your Ass Up)"
"Uh La La La"

International edition (2006)
"Hey Boy (Get Your Ass Up)" – 3:23
"Uh La La La" – 3:13
"I Want What I Want" – 3:04
"Wid Out Ya" – 3:03
"I Still Don't Know Ya" – 3:45
"Destiny" – 2:58
"Turn You On to Music" – 2:45
"Stay Outta My Way" – 3:20
"Life Like This" – 2:45
"I'm Callin' U" – 3:02
"Generation (B27)" – 3:17
"Who I Am?" – 3:09
+ all songs in instrumental karaoke versions

CD+DVD edition (2006)

CD
"Hey Boy (Get Your Ass Up)" – 3:23
"Uh La La La" – 3:13
"I Want What I Want" – 3:04
"Wid Out Ya" – 3:03
"I Still Don't Know Ya" – 3:45
"Destiny" – 2:58
"Turn You On to Music" – 2:45
"Stay Outta My Way" – 3:20
"Life Like This" – 2:45
"I'm Callin' U" – 3:02
"Generation (B27)" – 3:17
"Who I Am?" (Tola's Version) – 3:09
"Who I Am?" (Tola's Guitar Version) – 3:09
+ all songs in instrumental karaoke versions

DVD
Migawki / Schnappschüsse
Teledyski / Videoclips
Bravo TV Show
Wywiad z zespołem / Interview mit der Band
Koncert z Hamburga / Das Konzert in Hamburg
Making of the Videos
Video z dzieciństwa Toli / Aus Tolas Kindheit
Video z podpisywania płyt / Autogrammstunde

Charts

Weekly charts

Year-end charts

Certifications

References

External links
 LOL on Discogs

2005 albums
Blog 27 albums
European Border Breakers Award-winning albums